The Legend of Dragon Pearl (Chinese: 龙珠传奇) is a 2017 Chinese television series starring Yang Zi, Qin Junjie, Shu Chang and Mao Zijun. The series premiered on Anhui TV and Beijing TV on 8 May 2017. It aired airing two episodes per day from Monday to Wednesday at 22:00 (CST). VIP members of Youku get to view 12 episodes per week, released every Sunday at 3:00 (CST).

Synopsis
The story tells of Emperor Kangxi of the Qing dynasty and Li Yihuan, the last princess of the Southern Ming dynasty.
After the Qing conquest of the Ming, Li Yihuan and the rest of the descendants of the Ming dynasty retreat to the Dragon Pearl Canyon. There, they train under the guidance of the elders, learning various skills, hoping to restore the glory of their country one day. Li Yihuan was instructed by her teacher to get close to the Kangxi Emperor to seek an opportunity for revenge.

Li Yi Huan and Kang Xi met on a street in Beijing and became friends, unaware of the identity of each other. The princess wasn't aware of her true identity. They crossed each other's path again and faced several life-threatening events together, during which the princess risked her life to save the emperor.

After spending time together, they fell in love in spite of the initial prejudice of the last princess against the Qing emperor. But being of opposite sides, their love story is rendered impossible.

Cast

Main 
Yang Zi as Li Yihuan
The last princess of the Ming dynasty. Having been switched at birth, she is raised as the daughter of Li Dingguo without knowledge of her true identity. Hoping to right the wrongs, she was betrothed to Zhu Cixuan so that she becomes queen by way of marriage. Growing up, she is surrounded by mentors and friends who have dedicated their entire lives towards bringing down the Qing dynasty. Due to health reasons, she is exempted from rigorous training and courses throughout her childhood, yet maintained her cheerful and cheeky demeanour . 
When she sneaks out of her home she meets the Kangxi Emperor who is incognito as an ordinary man, and befriends him. Despite being aligned with the anti-Qing faction, Yihuan only wishes to live a carefree and simple life. As she spends more time with Kangxi, she realizes that he is a just ruler and gradually gives up on her plans for revenge. 
Qin Junjie as Kangxi Emperor 
The young emperor of Qing dynasty. Due to his young age and inexperience, he has yet to gather enough influence to have any say on matters involving the nation but he is clever, malleable and determined to bide his time in his plan to defeat Oboi. He disguises himself as an imperial guard named Longsan to infiltrate among his people and understand their sentiments. On a day when he was disguised as Longsan, he meets Yihuan when she was dressed as a boy and they quickly become friends and then sworn brothers. 
Shu Chang as Xue Qingcheng / Shu Wanxin
Yihuan's close childhood friend and senior. She is beautiful, reserved and very capable at what she does. She is in love with Zhu Cixuan, yet he only has eyes for Yihuan. In order to infiltrate the palace, she takes on the identity of Shu Wanxin, the daughter of a Qing dynasty official, and marries Kangxi as one of his concubines. 
Mao Zijun as Zhu Cixuan / Li Jianqing 
The crown prince of the Ming dynasty. Switched at birth, he is actually Li Dingguo's son. He is intelligent, level-headed and exemplary as the figurehead who has been tasked with the burden of reviving a nation at a very young age. Given his arranged marriage with Yihuan, he has always seen her as his wife and partner but is devastated when he realizes Yihuan loves Kangxi.

Supporting

People at Dragon Pearl Canyon
He Zhonghua as Li Dingguo
The former great general of Ming. A patriotic and loyal man who is willing to sacrifice anything for his country. 
Han Chengyu as Ye Mosheng
Yihuan's childhood friend who is secretly in love with her and becomes rash and impulsive in all things concerning her. His over attentiveness towards her causes issues between himself and Zhu Cixuan. 
Sun Wei as Fan Qianying
Yihuan's childhood friend. Her face was disfigured by a bear since young, causing her to be insecure about her looks. She falls in love with Wu Yingqi while carrying out her mission. 
Zhang Dan as Chen Shengnan 
Canti Lau as Fan Li 
Xiu Qing as Ye Mingzhang 
Tong Tong as Tang Yishou
Jiang Hong as Snow-clothed Warrior

People of the Qing dynasty

People in the palace
Siqin Gaowa as Empress Dowager Xiaozhuang
Zhang Weina as Empress Xiaochengren 
He Zhonghua as Li Defu
Kangxi's personal eunuch, who was poisoned by Oboi and forced to spy for him. He is also the twin brother of Li Dingguo. Despite being reluctant to help his brother with overthrowing the Qing dynasty, he secretly looks out for Yihuan and Zhu Cixuan in the palace.
Lu Xingyu as Songgotu 
Xiao Rongsheng as Oboi

Wu Sangui's household 
Liu Liwei as Wu Sangui
Liu Xueyi as Wu Yingqi
The second son of Wu Sangui. A kind-hearted and gentle man, who falls for Fan Qianying despite the scar on her face. 
Wang Yichan as Lady Qin, Wu Sangui's wife.
Li Zan as Shi Qinghong 
Wu Yingqi's personal bodyguard. He poisoned and killed Shu Jian to prevent him from divulging important information to Kangxi.

People in Shanxi Province  
Xie Ning as Liu Dezhao 
An evil and conniving official who uses unscrupulous methods to steal the villager's property and grains. 
Dai Zixiang as Meng Xianghe
Liu Dezhao's personal bodyguard who was tasked to protect him for 10 years. He is also Shu Wanxin's lover.
Cheng Cheng as Qiu Gui
Liu Dezhao's brother-in-law, and his fellow accomplice.  
Guo Ruixi as Lady Qiu, Liu Dezhao's wife. 
Wang Yao as Shu Jian
An upright and loyal official who was killed when he tried to report Wu Sangui and Liu Dezhao's evil deeds to Kangxi. He is also Shu Wanxin's father.

People of the Ming dynasty
Huang Haibing as Yongli Emperor
Wen Chunxiao as Empress Wang
Huang Juan as Lady Jin, Li Dingguo's wife.
Ren Jialun as Li Sixing
Li Dingguo's son, who went missing after witnessing his father kill his mother and sister. 
Zhou Tao as Sun Fu 
Li Sixing's formal lieutenant. After Li Sixing's departure, he submits to the Qing dynasty and becomes a magistrate.

Soundtrack

Ratings 

 Highest ratings are marked in red, lowest ratings are marked in blue

References

External links

Chinese historical television series
2017 Chinese television series debuts
Television series set in the Qing dynasty
Anhui Television original programming
Beijing Television original programming